The Vosges and Jura coal mining basins are an area of France located between two mountain ranges, that has been shaped by four centuries of coal extraction from the 16th century to the 20th century. It includes four coal basins in three geographic locations.

Basins and concessions

On the east side of the Vosges 
Villé valley coal basin
 Lalaye concession, exploited (first half of 19th century),
 Erlenbach concession, exploited (first half of 19th century),
 Saint-Hippolyte concession, exploited (1747 to mid-19th century),
 Sainte-Croix-aux-Mines concession, exploited (first half of 19th century).

Between the Vosges and the Jura 
Stephanian-Under-Vosgian coal basin
 Ronchamp, Champagney and Eboulet concessions, exploited by Ronchamp coal mines (1744-1958),
 Mourière concession, exploited (1844-1891),
 Lomont concession, unexploited (1904),
 Saint-Germain concession, unexploited (1914).

Keuperian coal basin
 Saulnot concession, exploited (16th to 1925),
 Gémonval concession, exploited (1826 to 1944),
 Gouhenans concession, exploited (1828 to 1916),
 Le Vernoy concession, exploited (1839 to 1852),
 Athesans concession, exploited (1839 to 1916),
 Vy-lès-Lure concession, exploited (1842 to 1943),
 Mélecey concession, exploited (1773 to the end of 19th).
 Grozon concession, exploited (1845 to the 1940s),

On the west side of the Jura 
Jura coal basin
 European Gas Limited concession, unexploited (2007).

References

External links

Coal mining regions in France